N. nana may refer to:
 Neurolepis nana, a grass species found only in Ecuador
 Nycteris nana, the dwarf slit-faced bat, a bat species living in forest and savanna regions of Central Africa

See also
 Nana (disambiguation)